The 2014 WGC-Cadillac Championship was a golf tournament played March 6–9 on the TPC Blue Monster course at Trump National Doral in Doral, Florida, a suburb west of Miami. It was the 15th WGC-Cadillac Championship tournament, and the second of the World Golf Championships events to be staged in 2014. Patrick Reed won his first WGC event and became the youngest WGC champion at age 23.

Course layout
The tournament is played on the TPC Blue Monster course.

Field
The field consists of players from the top of the Official World Golf Ranking and the money lists/Order of Merit from the six main professional golf tours. Each player is classified according to the first category in which he qualified, but other categories are shown in parentheses.

1. The top 30 players from the final 2013 FedExCup Points List

Keegan Bradley (7,9), Roberto Castro, Brendon de Jonge, Graham DeLaet (7,9), Luke Donald (7,9), Jason Dufner (7,9), Jim Furyk (7,9), Sergio García (2,7,8,9), Bill Haas (7,9), Billy Horschel (7,9), Dustin Johnson (7,9,10), Zach Johnson (7,9,10), Matt Kuchar (7,9), Hunter Mahan (7,9), Phil Mickelson (7,9), D. A. Points, Justin Rose (2,7,9), Charl Schwartzel (7,8,9), Adam Scott (4,7,9), Webb Simpson (7,9,10), Brandt Snedeker (7,9), Jordan Spieth (7,9), Henrik Stenson (2,7,9), Kevin Streelman (7,9), Steve Stricker (7,9), Nick Watney (7,9), Boo Weekley, Gary Woodland, Tiger Woods (7,9)

Jason Day (7,9) withdrew prior to the first round with a thumb injury.

2. The top 20 players from the final 2013 European Tour Race to Dubai

Thomas Bjørn (7,8,9), Jamie Donaldson (7,8,9), Victor Dubuisson (7,8,9), Ernie Els (7,8,9), Gonzalo Fernández-Castaño (7,9), Stephen Gallacher (7,8,9), Branden Grace (8), Joost Luiten (7,9), Matteo Manassero (7,9), Graeme McDowell (7,9), Francesco Molinari (7,9), Ian Poulter (7,9), Brett Rumford, Richard Sterne, Thongchai Jaidee, Peter Uihlein, Lee Westwood (7,9)

3. The top 2 players from the final 2013 Japan Golf Tour Order of Merit

Kim Hyung-sung, Hideki Matsuyama (7,9)

4. The top 2 players from the final 2013 PGA Tour of Australasia Order of Merit

Jin Jeong

5. The top 2 players from the final 2013 Sunshine Tour Order of Merit

Darren Fichardt, Dawie van der Walt

6. The top 2 players from the final 2013 Asian Tour Order of Merit

Kiradech Aphibarnrat, Scott Hend

7. The top 50 players from the Official World Golf Ranking, as of February 24, 2014

Jonas Blixt (9), Harris English (9,10), Rickie Fowler (9), Miguel Ángel Jiménez (9), Martin Kaymer, Chris Kirk (9,10), Rory McIlroy (9), Ryan Moore (9,10), Louis Oosthuizen (8,9), Patrick Reed (9,10), Jimmy Walker (9,10), Bubba Watson (9,10)

8. The top 10 players from the 2014 European Tour Race to Dubai, as of February 24, 2014

George Coetzee

9. The top 50 players from the Official World Golf Ranking, as of March 3, 2014

Russell Henley

10. The top 10 players from the 2014 FedExCup Points List, as of March 3, 2014

Kevin Stadler

Round summaries

First round
Thursday, March 6, 2014
Friday, March 7, 2014

Delays caused by thunderstorms meant that only six players completed their first round on Thursday. Five players led overnight at 3-under-par, including Harris English (the only one of the five to have completed his round), Jason Dufner, Hunter Mahan, Francesco Molinari and Patrick Reed.

Second round
Friday, March 7, 2014

Third round
Saturday, March 8, 2014

Final round
Sunday, March 9, 2014

Scorecard
Final round

References

External links

Coverage on the European Tour's official site

WGC Championship
Golf in Florida
WGC-Cadillac Championship
WGC-Cadillac Championship
WGC-Cadillac Championship
WGC-Cadillac Championship